Piet Hamberg (born 22 January 1954) is a former Dutch footballer and manager. He worked at Liverpool as technical manager for their academy.

Playing career
Hamberg began his youth career with Groningen. During his playing career, Hamberg represented NEC, Wageningen, Utrecht, Servette and Ajax. During a European Cup clash in Madrid his knee was injured, and it took him quite a while to get fit. Once he was declared fit to play, the same knee was injured in a match against PSV Eindhoven and he was sidelined for quite a period yet again, and eventually an Achilles tendon injury ended his career as a player.

Hamberg played in one match for Netherlands national football team, but was unavailable for further selection due to the Achilles tendon injury that ended his career.

Managerial career
After his playing career, Hamberg became a coach and worked in Saudi Arabia, Libya, the United Arab Emirates and Togo. He led the Saudi Arabia under-20 team toward the World Cup before becoming a manager at Libyan club Al-Ahly. In 2003, he replaced fellow Dutch manager Jan Versleijen at Al-Jazira Club in the United Arab Emirates. For Togo he was the assistant to manager Otto Pfister at their 2006 FIFA World Cup campaign. However, Hamberg and Pfister stepped back from their position after it was announced that their players had not received any promised money for qualifying for the World Cup. Eventually Pfister returned before their World Cup opener against South Korea, but Hamberg decided not to and told the press he is a man of his words. In between he was manager and technical director of Grasshopper Club Zürich in two different stints between 1997 and April 2007. As a result of his successes, Hamberg became known as one of the best youth developers in the world, leading to his appointment as technical manager for Liverpool F.C. Academy in July 2007. His successes continued at Liverpool, as he groomed six youth international players and guided the under-18 team to the Football Association Youth Cup Final.
 
On 11 May, Liverpool announced that Hamberg was to leave the club at the end of the season. No reason was given for his departure. On 22 December 2009, he became the manager of Tunisian club ES Sahel, until 15 April 2010. Later on, he worked as an assistant coach and scout at Red Bull Salzburg, then he returned to ES Sahel to work as the head of youth department for two years. Afterwards, he worked as an assistant coach at Al Jazira and Al-Ittihad with Henk ten Cate.

Honours

Club
Servette
Swiss Super League: 1978–79
Swiss Cup: 1978–79
Swiss League Cup: 1979
Coppa delle Alpi: 1979

Ajax
Eredivisie: 1981–82

Individual
 Swiss Foreign Footballer of the Year: 1979–80

References

External links
Piet Hamberg at ELFvoetbal.nl 

1954 births
Living people
Dutch footballers
Dutch expatriate footballers
Dutch football managers
Dutch expatriate football managers
Eredivisie players
NEC Nijmegen players
FC Wageningen players
FC Utrecht players
AFC Ajax players
Servette FC players
Expatriate footballers in Switzerland
Dutch expatriate sportspeople in Switzerland
Expatriate football managers in the United Arab Emirates
Dutch expatriate sportspeople in the United Arab Emirates
Liverpool F.C. non-playing staff
People from Winschoten
Grasshopper Club Zürich managers
Étoile Sportive du Sahel managers
Association football midfielders
Footballers from Groningen (province)
Dutch expatriate sportspeople in Austria
Dutch expatriate sportspeople in Tunisia
Dutch expatriate sportspeople in Saudi Arabia
Expatriate football managers in Tunisia
Dutch expatriate sportspeople in Libya
Expatriate football managers in Libya
Dutch expatriate sportspeople in Togo
Dutch expatriate sportspeople in England
Ittihad FC managers
Al Jazira Club managers
Al-Ahly SC (Benghazi) managers